Robat Tork (also Romanized as Robāţ Tork and Robāţ-e Tork; also known as Ribāt-i-Turk and Robāt-i-Turk) is a village in Hastijan Rural District, in the Central District of Delijan County, Markazi Province, Iran. At the 2006 census, its population was 348, in 132 families.

References 

Populated places in Delijan County